Services Preparatory Institute  is a public military school in Aurangabad, Maharashtra, India. It was established in 1977 by the Government of Maharashtra to prepare students academically, mentally and physically for the written Union Public Service Commission examination for the National Defence Academy, Indian Naval Academy and for interviews with the Services Selection Board.

In 2019, 13 SPI cadets selected for National Defence and Naval Academies.

In 2020, Over 13,000 applicants in race for 60 seats at SPI in Aurangabad.

In 2020, 22 cadets from SPI in Aurangabad make it to Indian Armed Forces.

In 2021, SPI gets 5,779 applications for 60 seats.

In 2021, 11 SPI cadets make it to NDA, INA.

History
After establishment of National Defence Academy in 1954, it was observed that the number of Maharashtrian boys were less, for finding a solution over this issue a committee was formed under the chairmanship of Lt. Gen SPP Thorat ( Retd ), Kirti Chakra, Padmashree, DSO, D'Lit and Services Preparatory Institute was hence established in 1977.

References

State agencies of Maharashtra
Education in Aurangabad, Maharashtra
Educational institutions established in 1977
1977 establishments in Maharashtra